Famine is a 1981 horror novel written by Scottish writer Graham Masterton. The story is about a nationwide famine that sweeps America, rendering all sources of food contaminated in one way or another.

The plot revolves around Ed Hardesty, a wheat farmer who owns South Burlington Farm, Kingman County, Kansas and his attempt to find out the cause of the blight that has stricken his wheat crop, as well as every other crop in the United States. Though there are numerous other characters, Ed is indeed the protagonist and is the focal point for the book's progression.

References

1980s horror novels
1981 British novels
Novels set in Kansas
Kingman County, Kansas
Sphere Books books